The 2023 Elon Phoenix football team will represent Elon University as a member of the Colonial Athletic Association (CAA) during the 2023 NCAA Division I FCS football season. The Phoenix are led by fifth-year head coach Tony Trisciani and play home games at Rhodes Stadium in Elon, North Carolina.

Previous season

The Phoenix finished the 2022 season with an overall record of 8–4, 6–2 CAA play to finish in a tie for second place. They lost 31–6 to Furman in the NCAA Division I First Round.

Schedule

References

Elon
Elon Phoenix football seasons
Elon Phoenix football